Josep Bonaplata i Corriol (1795 - Bunyol, 2 June 1843) was a Catalan industrial entrepreneur known for introducing the steam engine into Catalonia and Spain. His parents, Ramon Bonaplata and Teresa Corriol, were textile manufacturers, principally of chintz, and he had three brothers, Salvador, Ramon and Narcís.

Youth and trip to England

Josep Bonaplata worked at the family factory until his father retired and the business was inherited by his older brother, Salvador. In 1828 Josep and his friend Joan Vilaregut then started a cotton textile factory in Sallent, with mechanical looms that were hydro-powered by the Llobregat river. In 1829, in an attempt to modernise his business, he was given permission by the Spanish government to import an English steam engine.

Bonaplata travelled to Britain with Joan Rull and a man named Camps to learn about the textile industry in Lancashire and to buy the necessary machinery from the Boulton & Watt manufactory in Birmingham. In London, he received authorisation to import a steam engine from the Spanish ambassador Francisco Cea Bermúdez. Bonaplata and Rull returned to Catalonia in July 1830, but Camps stayed in Manchester to continue learning about the machinery, in particular Richard Roberts' self-acting spinning mule, which Bonaplata planned to produce under licence.

Industrial entrepreneur

On 30 September 1831 Bonaplata formed the firm Bonaplata, Rull, Vilaregut i Cia with his three brothers, his friend Joan Vilaregut, and his new partner Joan Rull. The company was capitalized with 1.600.000 reales. The Bonaplata Factory (also known as El Vapor) was in Carrer Tallers in Barcelona's Raval neighborhood, and it had two activities: in 1832 an iron foundry was installed with a workshop for making mechanical looms, and in November 1833 the mechanical weaving and spinning manufactory opened. This was the first factory in Spain to use a steam engine to power machinery. Its value and social impact was immediately recognised, as it employed roughly 700 people, and it inspired the modernisation of the economy.

However, the factory was assaulted and burned on the night of 4 and 5 August 1835 by Luddite gangs known as Bullangues The losses from the disaster were put at 2.696.625 reales. Bonaplata sued the Spanish government for failing to stop the riot. Initially, the government tried to elude responsibility, but then asked the Cortes Generales (parliament) for permission to pay a compensation. On 1 April 1837, Josep Bonaplata appeared before the Cortes and agreed to rebuild a new and bigger steam-powered factory to begin the modernisation of Spanish industry, but the treasury committee decided that he must give up any compensation claims if he wanted state investment for his new venture.

By this time, Bonaplata was living in a modest room in Madrid where he formed Bonaplata, Sandford y Cía to restart the project. The business was established in the former convent of Santa Barbara, in the Hortaleza neighbourhood.  He was now forty-two, and still single. The business included his second iron foundry and an engineer named William Sanford. Bonaplata was probably suffering a breathing disorder, which could explain why his younger brothers Ramon and Narcís joined him here. In 1839 the company name was changed to Bonaplata y Hermanos (Bonaplata and Brothers), and Sanford remained as a technician. Ramon took over the Madrid business, which was capitalised with 200.000 reales, while Narcís opened a new blast furnace in Seville capitalised with 90.000 reales. Major decisions for both businesses were still taken by Josep.

Two years later Narcís took full control of the Andalusian factory, leaving Bonaplata y Hermanos in Madrid capitalised with 403,063 reales. Although Josep Bonaplata owned the bigger part of the Santa Barbara concern, the legal documents acknowledged his brother Ramon as its lone administrator, probably because of Josep's poor health, though he retained the right to act on whatever he thought necessary.

The rural business

A few months after the destruction of El Vapor,  in December 1835, Josep Bonaplata had paid 187,000 reales for the Espinar estate in the Valencian village of Llíria. Here he built an olive oil mill, and planted many almond trees. He also invested 1,190,000 reales in a project that would link the Cinca and Segre to irrigate the Llitera area. The plan was promoted by his friend Antoni Gassó, but it came to nothing.

Illness and death

The severe respiratory disorders that Bonaplata had been suffering affected his work. Fearing a last attack, he made his will in May 1840. Three years later he decided to retire at the Espinar farmhouse in Llíria. On 30 May 1843, Bonaplata handed his will to his executor and started the trip, but he suffered a fatal asthma attack on 2 June close to the nearby village of Bunyol. He was 48.

He died without progeny so the brothers were his successors. It is known that he had had an illegitimate daughter named Sofia, but she died at birth in 1840. It is likely that Josep and the mother of his child, Jesusa Romero, became a couple.

References

Footnotes

Bibliography 

 
 
Burning Barcelona by Roger Williams (Bristol Book Publishing 2008) is an historical novel about the installation of the steam engine by Josep Bonaplata and William Sanford, an engineer from the Boulton & Watt manufactory.

Businesspeople in textiles
Businesspeople from Catalonia
19th-century ironmasters
1795 births
1843 deaths
19th-century Spanish businesspeople
Spanish industrialists
19th-century industrialists